The 3.7 cm SockelFlak L/14.5 was an early German light anti-aircraft gun deployed in limited numbers towards the end of the First World War.

History 
The SockelFlak started life as defensive armament for Zeppelin airships against fighter attack.  However, once defenders discovered that airships filled with hydrogen were vulnerable to machine guns firing tracer ammunition Zeppelin losses mounted and the Germans switched to less vulnerable bomber aircraft.  This meant that the SockelFlak needed to find a new role.

As the threat posed by ground attack aircraft increased the need for specialized anti-aircraft guns also increased.  At first, all of the combatants employed heavy machine guns and light field guns on improvised anti-aircraft mounts to combat reconnaissance and ground attack aircraft.  Heavy machine guns were often placed on improvised pedestal mounts while light field guns were typically propped up on earthen embankments or scaffolds to point the muzzle pointed skyward.  A heavy machine gun was capable of shooting down an attacking aircraft but the amount of time on target was brief and the probability of scoring a killing blow with rifle caliber rounds wasn't that great.  While a medium caliber anti-aircraft gun  was capable of destroying an attacking aircraft with one shot but its slow rate of fire combined with its slow elevation and traverse limited its usefulness against small fast moving targets at short range.  Instead, the niche for medium caliber anti-aircraft guns was as a barrage weapon firing timed explosives at distant targets.  What was needed was a fast firing, mobile, and easy to wield weapon which could fire a small explosive round to destroy an attacking aircraft with a few well-placed shots.  It was under these conditions that the SockelFlak was redesigned to fulfill the light anti-aircraft role.

Design 

The SockelFlak was a gas-operated automatic cannon which fired a  steel base fused explosive round with two brass driving bands.  The gun was mounted on a light three-legged pedestal mount with a seat for the gunner and could be broken down into four loads for short-range transport or carried in one piece on a cart by a two-horse team for longer trips.  There were two spade grips for aiming and the gun was fired by a trigger operated by the gunner's knee while seated.  Since the gun wasn't originally meant for field use it was prone to stoppages due to dust and dirt.  It had a cyclic rate of fire of 120 rounds per minute but its top loaded 10 round clip was slow to change which meant that although easy to wield it had a limited time on target and slow practical rate of fire.  The first 20 guns were delivered in December 1917 and by the time of the armistice, there were 150 in service.

References 

37 mm artillery
World War I anti-aircraft guns
Anti-aircraft guns of Germany
Autocannon